Polly Pocket: Lunar Eclipse (originally known as Polly Pocket's The First Movie or Polly Pocket)  is a 2004 American animated adventure short film based on the Polly Pocket line of dolls. It was the first animated film based on the franchise, the first of three developed by Universal Studios, succeeded by films Polly Pocket 2: Cool at the Pocket Plaza and PollyWorld. Despite its obscure reception in the United States, the film became popular in Latin American countries due to the high sales of the Polly Pocket line at the time in the region.

In the United States, the film was released as a free box prize whenever you bought any select Polly Pocket playset or Kellogg's cereal, and as a bonus with the "Divine Dogs" playset of the "Dazzling Pet Show" line. The film has some scene cameos of My Scene: Jammin' In Jamaica.

As of 2021, the movie is now available to watch on Paramount+ with a subscription, making it the first film in the Polly Pocket series to be available to watch on a streaming service.

Plot

The film stars the title character and popular doll of the same name, Polly Pocket. Her friends Lila, Ana, Shani, Todd, Rick, and Lea also star.

A few days before their school dance, Polly and the other girls are given the assignment to learn about lunar eclipses, which will count for one-third of their grades. Unfortunately, Lila fears she will be grounded and unable to play with the rest of the girls in their band, Polly and the Pockets if she does not get a good grade. Polly and her friends organize a trip to her family's South Pacific island where a lunar eclipse will be visible that night. Meanwhile, Beth, a classmate who is jealous of Polly, tampers with Lila's camera so she will not be able to take photos of the eclipse, and cause her to fail her assignment.

Polly and her friends arrive at the island and spend all day at the special water park. As it gets dark, the friends start to observe the eclipse. They stop to help a dolphin calf, stuck near the beach, return to the sea. When they arrive home, Lila discovers that the photos she took of the eclipse were spoiled by Beth's prank, as they contain double-exposures. Luckily, Polly comes up with a plan to save the project with Ana's help. The girls are given an A+, and Polly and her band manage to perform at the school dance, and the film ends.

Official Description From Paramount+
"Join Polly and her friends as they travel to her father's island in the Pacific to research lunar eclipses. But the pressure is on! If they don't get a good grade for the project, Lila will be grounded and Polly's band, "Polly and the Pockets" won't be able to play at the school dance! Will they ace the project and get to play? Or will frenemies get in the way... "

Cast
Tegan Moss as Polly
 Brittney Wilson as Lila
Nicole Bouma as Ana
Chiara Zanni as Shani
Natalie Walters as Lea
Russell Roberts as Samuel
Tabitha St. Germain as Beth
Nicole Oliver as Evie
Jocelyne Loewen as Tori
Teryl Rothery as Ms. Marklin
Matt Hill as Todd
Andrew Francis as Rick

References

External links
 

2004 direct-to-video films
2004 animated films
2004 films
American children's films
Direct-to-video animated films
Universal Pictures direct-to-video animated films
Universal Pictures direct-to-video films
Films based on Mattel toys
2000s American animated films
2000s English-language films